Phantasy, Phantasie, or Phantasies may refer to:
 Fantasy (psychology), spelt phantasy particularly by Kleinian psychoanalysts when referring to unconscious phantasy to differentiate it from (conscious) fantasy.
 Phantasy (record label)
 Phantasie (series), a fantasy role-playing video game series
 Phantasie, 1985
 Phantasie II, 1986
 Phantasie III, 1987
 Phantasies, a series of animated cartoons
 Phantasies (album), a 1984 album by the American jazz pianist Jaki Byard with the Apollo Stompers

See also
 Fantasy (disambiguation)